Lourenço Martins (born ) is a Portuguese male volleyball player. He is part of the Portugal men's national volleyball team. On club level he plays for Sporting CP.

References

External links
 profile at FIVB.org

1997 births
Living people
Sporting CP volleyball players
Portuguese men's volleyball players
Place of birth missing (living people)